Satrangee Parachute is a Hindi-language film released 25 February 2011. The film revolves around an eight-year-old runaway kid who runs away from his village in Nainital to Mumbai with four of his friends.

Plot
Pappu (Siddhartha Sanghani), leader of a group of precocious kids, sets off to find a parachute for their visually impaired friend Kuhu. Pappu's parents, Chhotulal (Zakir Hussain) and Sumitra (Rupali Ganguly), worry for him but this is not the first time he has run away. However, the other parents are angry with Pappu for leading their kids astray.

When the five children overhear a man (Ashraf-ul-haq) mention buying a parachute, the kids follow him and his friends, but it turns out that the four men are terrorists planning an operation needing parachutes.

The police mistake the five kids as members of the terrorists and they are arrested. The investigating officer Rhino (Kay Kay Menon) gets nothing from the kids, so his commanding officer (Jackie Shroff) takes over.

Cast
 Rajvi Patel as Kuhu
 Jackie Shroff as Jay Singh
 Rupali Ganguly as Sumitra C. Sharma
 Sanjay Mishra as Daroga Pratap Singh
 Kay Kay Menon as Rhino
 Rajpal Yadav as Parimal Babu
 Lilliput Faruqui

Soundtrack
The music was composed by Kaushik Dutta, Shamir Tandon and released by Saregama.

Reception
The Times of India gave Satrangee Parachute 2 stars out of 5, saying "Why does the world's biggest film industry dish out the saddest kiddie films, week after week? Why can't Bollywood go the Hollywood way and treat children's film as hardcore, high market entertainment? Why must our film makers give the tween and teen film market a step motherly treatment.... Sadly Satrangee Parachute fails to address any of these questions with its narrative that appeals neither to kids nor to adults."

References

External links

Official trailer

2011 films
2010s Hindi-language films
Indian children's films
Films set in Mumbai
Films scored by Shamir Tandon